Gonu may refer to:
Gonu game.
Cyclone Gonu
Gonu, Iran
Government of National Unity
Gönü, Karacabey